Christopher Van Hollen Jr. (born January 10, 1959) is an American attorney  and politician serving as the junior United States senator from Maryland since 2017. A member of the Democratic Party, Van Hollen served as the U.S. representative for Maryland's 8th congressional district from 2003 to 2017.

In 2007, Van Hollen became the chair of the Democratic Congressional Campaign Committee (DCCC). In this post, he was responsible for leading efforts to defend vulnerable Democrats and get more Democrats elected to Congress in 2008, which he did. House Speaker Nancy Pelosi created a new leadership post, Assistant to the Speaker, in 2006 so that Van Hollen could be present at all leadership meetings. He was elected ranking member on the Budget Committee on November 17, 2010. Pelosi appointed Van Hollen to the 12-member bipartisan Committee on Deficit Reduction with a mandate for finding major budget reductions by late 2011. On October 17, 2013, Pelosi appointed Van Hollen to serve on the bicameral conference committee.

Van Hollen ran for the United States Senate in 2016 to replace retiring Senator Barbara Mikulski. He defeated U.S. Representative Donna Edwards in the Democratic primary and won the general election with 61% of the vote to Republican nominee Kathy Szeliga's 36%. He was reelected in 2022 with nearly 66% of the vote to Republican nominee Chris Chaffee's 34%. Van Hollen chaired the Democratic Senatorial Campaign Committee (DSCC) from 2017 to 2019.

Early life, education, and career
Van Hollen was born in Karachi, Pakistan, the eldest of three children of American parents, Edith Eliza (née Farnsworth) and Christopher Van Hollen. His father was a Foreign Service officer who served as Deputy Assistant Secretary of State for Near Eastern Affairs (1969–1972) and U.S. Ambassador to Sri Lanka and the Maldives (1972–1976); his mother worked in the Central Intelligence Agency and the State Department, where she served as chief of the intelligence bureau for South Asia. He spent parts of his early life in Pakistan, Turkey, India, and Sri Lanka. He returned to the United States for his junior year of high school, and attended Middlesex School in Concord, Massachusetts, where his grandfather once taught.

He is an alumnus of the Kodaikanal International School in southern India. In 1982, Van Hollen graduated from Swarthmore College with a Bachelor of Arts degree in philosophy. He continued his studies at Harvard University, where he earned a Master of Public Policy degree, concentrating in national security studies, from the John F. Kennedy School of Government in 1985. He earned a Juris Doctor from the Georgetown University Law Center in 1990.

Early political career
Van Hollen worked as a legislative assistant for defense and foreign policy to U.S. Senator Charles Mathias, a Republican from Maryland, from 1985 to 1987. He was also a staff member of the U.S. Senate Committee on Foreign Relations (1987–1989), and a legislative advisor for federal affairs to Maryland Governor William Donald Schaefer (1989–1991). He was admitted to the Maryland bar in 1990, and joined the law firm of Arent Fox.

Maryland State Legislature
Van Hollen served in the Maryland General Assembly from 1991 to 2003, first in the House of Delegates (1991–95) and then in the State Senate (1995–2003). In the Senate, he served on the Budget and Taxation Committee and the Health and Human Services Subcommittee. He led successful efforts to raise the tobacco tax, prohibit oil drilling in the Chesapeake Bay, mandate trigger locks for guns, and increase funding for education and healthcare. In 2002, The Washington Post called Van Hollen "one of the most accomplished members of the General Assembly."

U.S. House of Representatives (2003–2017)

Elections
Before Van Hollen's election, incumbent Connie Morella had won eight elections in the district, despite being a Republican in a district that had swung heavily Democratic. Morella's success was largely attributed to her political independence and relatively liberal voting record, including support for abortion rights, gay rights, gun control and increased environmental protections.

After Morella's reelection in 2000, Democratic Maryland Senate President Thomas V. Miller, Jr. made no secret that he wanted to draw the 8th out from under Morella. Indeed, one redistricting plan after the 2000 census divided the 8th in two, giving one district to Van Hollen and forcing Morella to run against popular State Delegate Mark Kennedy Shriver. The final plan was far less ambitious, but made the district even more Democratic than its predecessor.  It absorbed nine heavily Democratic precincts from neighboring Prince George's County, an area Morella had never represented. It also restored a heavily Democratic spur in eastern Montgomery County that had been cut out in the last round of redistricting. Van Hollen defeated Morella in the 2002 general election in part, according to some analysts, because of this redistricting.

In 2002, Van Hollen entered a competitive Democratic primary against Shriver and former Clinton administration aide Ira Shapiro. Though Shriver had the most money, Van Hollen launched a grassroots effort that mobilized Democratic voters. After receiving the endorsement of The Washington Post, The Baltimore Sun, and other local papers, Van Hollen defeated Shriver, 43.5% to 40.6%.

During the campaign, Van Hollen emphasized that even when Morella voted with the district, her partisan affiliation kept Tom DeLay and the rest of her party's more conservative leadership in power. Van Hollen also touted his leadership in the State Senate on issues such as education funding, HMO reform, trigger locks for handguns, and protecting the Chesapeake Bay from oil drilling. Van Hollen defeated Morella, 51.7% to 48.2%. He crushed Morella in Prince George's County while narrowly winning Montgomery County. Morella won most of the precincts she had previously represented.

Van Hollen was reelected four times from this district with over 70% of the vote.

After the 2010 census, Van Hollen's district was made slightly less Democratic. He lost a heavily Democratic spur of Montgomery County to the neighboring 6th district, and lost his share of Prince George's County to the 4th district. In their place, the 8th absorbed a strongly Republican spur of Frederick County, as well as the southern part of even more Republican Carroll County. Nonetheless, his share of Montgomery County has more than double the population of his shares of Carroll and Frederick Counties combined, and Van Hollen won a sixth term over Republican Ken Timmerman with 63% of the vote. He lost in Carroll and Frederick, but swamped Timmerman in Montgomery by 113,500 votes.

Tenure
In 2003, the Committee for Education Funding, a nonpartisan education coalition founded in 1969, named Van Hollen its Outstanding New Member of the Year. The first bill Van Hollen introduces every session is the Keep Our Promise to America's Children and Teachers (Keep Our PACT) Act, which would fully fund No Child Left Behind and Individuals with Disabilities Education Act. He introduced an amendment, which passed, that repealed a 9.5 percent loophole in student loans that had allowed lenders to pocket billions of taxpayer dollars. Now, that money is available for additional student loans.

Because many federal employees live in his district, Van Hollen has worked on a number of issues relating to them. He supported pay parity in pay raises for civilian employees and introduced an amendment, which passed, to block attempts to outsource federal jobs.

Van Hollen has secured federal funding for a number of local-interest projects, including transportation initiatives, local homeland security efforts, education programs and community development projects. He and Adam Schiff (D-CA) often discuss issues of National Security on the floor of the House in tandem, with particular commentary on the wars in Afghanistan and Iraq.

In May 2006, Van Hollen formed a congressional caucus on the Netherlands with Dutch-born Republican U.S. Representative Pete Hoekstra from Michigan. The goal of the caucus is to promote the U.S. relationship with the Netherlands and remember the Dutch role in establishing the State of New York and the United States.

In July 2006, Van Hollen urged the Bush administration to support a ceasefire supported by a peacekeeping force that would end the 2006 Lebanon War. He was criticized by elements of the Jewish and pro-Israel community, a large part of his constituency, for criticizing U.S. and Israeli policy in the Lebanon conflict. In follow-up comments, Van Hollen indicated that his original comments were meant as a critique of Bush administration policy but did not retract his position, and other members of the local Jewish and pro-Israel community defended him.

In 2006, Van Hollen opted out of the race to succeed the retiring Senator Paul Sarbanes, saying he would rather spend time with his family and help elect more Democrats to Congress. In keeping with that, Van Hollen was appointed to Chairman of the Democratic Congressional Campaign Committee.

In 2009, Van Hollen introduced a bill which establishes a green bank to catalyze the financing of clean energy and energy efficiency projects. He reintroduced the same bill again in 2014.

In March 2010, when Charles Rangel was forced to resign as Chairman of the Committee on Ways and Means over ethics charges, Van Hollen played a key role in having Sander Levin succeed to the Chairmanship over Pete Stark. Stark was the second-most experienced member of the committee while Levin was third, and party tradition would have made Stark chairman due to seniority. However, Van Hollen and other younger members saw Stark's past intemperate comments as a liability to the Democrats in an election year.

On April 29, 2010, Van Hollen introduced the campaign finance DISCLOSE Act. He reintroduced the bill for the 113th Congress on February 9, 2012.

In April 2011, Van Hollen sued the Federal Election Commission, charging it with regulatory capture and the creation of a loophole that allowed unlimited and undisclosed financing in the 2010 election season. According to Van Hollen, had it not been for the loophole, "much of the more than $135 million in secret contributions that funded expenditures would have been disclosed."

During the 2012 Obama reelection campaign, Van Hollen participated in one-on-one debate prep with vice president Joe Biden, impersonating the Republican vice-presidential candidate Paul Ryan.

Committee assignments
 Committee on the Budget (Ranking Member)
 Joint Select Committee on Deficit Reduction

Party leadership and caucus memberships
 Ranking Member on the House Budget Committee
 Vice Chairman of the Renewable Energy and Energy Efficiency Caucus
 Co-chairman of the Congressional Soccer Caucus
 Co-chairman of the Chesapeake Bay Watershed Task Force
 Co-chairman of the Congressional Caucus on Global Road Safety
 Vice Chairman of the Democratic Task Force on Budget and Tax Policy
 Member of the Congressional Asian Pacific American Caucus
 Member of the Sustainable Energy and Environment Coalition
 International Conservation Caucus
 Congressional Chesapeake Bay Watershed Caucus
 Chairman, Congressional Down Syndrome Caucus
Afterschool Caucuses

U.S. Senate (2017–present)

Elections

2016 

Van Hollen defeated Republican Kathy Szeliga in the general election, 61% to 36%. He replaced Democrat Barbara Mikulski, who had retired from the Senate after serving for 30 years.

2022 

Van Hollen was reelected to a second term in 2022, defeating Republican Chris Chaffee with 65.8% of the vote to Chaffee's 34.1%.

Tenure
115th Congress (2017–2019)
Shortly after the 2016 elections, Van Hollen was selected as the Chairman of the Democratic Senatorial Campaign Committee (DSCC) for the 2018 cycle.

117th Congress (2021–present)

Van Hollen was walking to the Senate chambers to speak during the 2021 United States Electoral College vote count when he was stopped by U.S. Capitol Police telling him that the building was on lockdown due to the attack on the Capitol. He returned to his office, where he remained for the duration of the attack. In the immediate wake of the insurrection, Van Hollen called Trump a "political arsonist" and said "I never thought we would live to see the day that violent mobs seized control of the Capitol. I cry for our country." As Van Hollen waited for the Capitol to be secured, he said he wanted an immediate investigation, calling the perpetrators "a violent mob." He also contrasted the police's treatment of the rioters with events that led to the use of tear gas on peaceful demonstrators, such as Black Lives Matter protests. After Congress returned to session to count the electoral votes, he voted against objections raised by some Republican senators. Van Hollen also called for Trump's "immediate removal" via the Twenty-fifth Amendment to the United States Constitution and said, "we should have looked at that option much earlier."

Committee assignments

Current
Committee on Appropriations
Subcommittee on Commerce, Justice, Science, and Related Agencies
Subcommittee on Financial Services and General Government (Chair)
Subcommittee on Interior, Environment, and Related Agencies
Subcommittee on State, Foreign Operations, and Related Programs
Subcommittee on Transportation, Housing and Urban Development, and Related Agencies
Committee on Banking, Housing, and Urban Affairs
Subcommittee on Housing, Transportation, and Community Development
Subcommittee on Financial Institutions and Consumer Protection
Subcommittee on Securities, Insurance, and Investment
Committee on Foreign Relations
Committee on the Budget

Previous
Committee on Environment and Public Works (2017–2021)

Caucus memberships
Congressional NextGen 9-1-1 Caucus
Expand Social Security Caucus

Political positions

Economy
According to his campaign website, Van Hollen supports an increase in the minimum wage, paid sick leave, an expansion of the Earned Income Tax Credit, equal pay for women, an increase in the child care tax credit, and a financial transactions tax.

Elections
In October 2018, Van Hollen and Susan Collins cosponsored the Protect Our Elections Act, legislation that would block "any persons from foreign adversaries from owning or having control over vendors administering U.S. elections" and would make companies involved in administering elections reveal foreign owners and inform local, state and federal authorities if said ownership changes. Companies failing to comply would face fines of $100,000.

Foreign policy
In May 2020, Van Hollen voiced his opposition to Israel's plan to annex parts of the Israeli-occupied West Bank.

Gun control
Van Hollen has been endorsed by the Brady Campaign to Prevent Gun Violence, a group which campaigns for more government regulation of guns. Van Hollen received a 0% from the Gun Owners of America (GOA) in 2006. In September 2008, Van Hollen voted against repealing portions of the Washington, D.C. Firearm Ban.

In 2015, Van Hollen introduced legislation for increased handgun licensing, specifically the requirement for permit-to-purchase licenses. This proposal was based on a similar law that exists in Maryland. On proposing the law, Van Hollen stated that "States require licenses to drive a car or even to fish in local rivers, so requiring a license to buy a deadly handgun is a common-sense step that could save countless lives."

In response to the 2017 Las Vegas shooting, Van Hollen co-sponsored a bill to ban bump stocks.

Health
Van Hollen supports Obamacare and has defended it many times. He is also pro-choice and he was an original co-sponsor of the Women’s Health Protection Act of 2021.

Journalism 
In July 2019 Van Hollen cosponsored the Fallen Journalists Memorial Act, a bill introduced by Ben Cardin and Rob Portman that would create a privately funded memorial to be constructed on federal lands in Washington, D.C. to honor journalists, photographers, and broadcasters who died in the line of duty.

LGBTQIA+ rights
Van Hollen supports transgender rights, having signed a letter in July 2017 in opposition to an announced military ban.

Taxes
Van Hollen received a 0% rating for the Citizens Against Government Waste (CAGW), and the National Taxpayers Union (NTU), in 2010. Both these organizations advocate for lower taxes for everyone including the wealthy. In 2006, Van Hollen received a 100% rating from Citizens for Tax Justice (CTJ), a group that calls for higher taxes on the wealthy. Van Hollen opposes eliminating the federal estate tax.

Personal life
Van Hollen and his wife Katherine have three children: Anna, Nicholas, and Alexander. Van Hollen is of Dutch descent. Van Hollen is Episcopalian.

Health
On May 15, 2022, Van Hollen announced that he had a minor stroke over that weekend and would stay at George Washington University Hospital for a few days. He further said he was expected to make a full recovery with no long-term effects and would return to his work in the Senate later in the week.

Electoral history

See also
 List of United States senators born outside the United States
 Trump–Ukraine scandal

References

Further reading
 Barone, Michael,  and Chuck McCutcheon. The Almanac of American Politics 2012 (2011) pp 762–5

External links

Senator Van Hollen official U.S. Senate website
Chris Van Hollen for Senate campaign website

|-

|-

|-

|-

|-

|-

|- 

|-

1959 births
21st-century American politicians
American Episcopalians
American expatriates in Pakistan
American gun control activists
American people of Dutch descent
Democratic Party Maryland state senators
Democratic Party members of the Maryland House of Delegates
Democratic Party members of the United States House of Representatives from Maryland
Democratic Party United States senators from Maryland
Georgetown University Law Center alumni
Harvard Kennedy School alumni
Kodaikanal International School alumni
Living people
Middlesex School alumni
People from Kensington, Maryland
Politicians from Karachi
Swarthmore College alumni